The 2018 season is Stabæk's fifth season back in the Eliteserien following their relegation in 2012, their 22nd season in the top flight of Norwegian football. 

The season was marred by several long-term injuries, mostly sustained in pre-season or even the previous season. Moussa Njie missed the first half of the season due to an ankle injury, Luc Kassi due to a thigh injury, and Håkon Skogseid with a hip. Raymond Gyasi broke his leg in late March whereas Steinar Strømnes sustained a head injury in a B-team match.

Squad

Transfers

Winter

In:

 

 

 

Out:

}

Summer

In:

Out:

Competitions

Eliteserien

Results summary

Results by round

Results

Table

Relegation play-offs

Norwegian Cup

Squad statistics

Appearances and goals

|-
|colspan="14"|Players away from Stabæk on loan:
|-
|colspan="14"|Players who left Stabæk during the season:

|}

Goal scorers

Disciplinary record

References

Stabæk Fotball seasons
Stabæk